Tritón may refer to:
 Tritón (magazine)
 Tritón (wrestler)